Hecate Enthroned are an English symphonic black metal band initially founded with members from both Wales and England, but are now primarily based around Cheshire, England. The band formed in 1993 as a blackened death metal act under the name Amethyst, changing their name to Daemonum later on. By 1995 the band had adopted the name Hecate Enthroned and a symphonic black metal style.

The band's name alludes to the Ancient Greek goddess of magic and necromancy, Hecate.

History

Early years: 1993–1995
The band that would become Hecate Enthroned formed in 1993 in Wrexham, Wales. They were a blackened death metal band by the name of Daemonum (previously known as Amethyst), whose members were Jon Kennedy, Nigel Dennen, Ian Maiden, Mark Watson-Jones, Steve, Gary and Marc. They released in 1993 a demo tape, Dreams to Mourn. In 1994, after being invited by Dani Filth to play bass on his band, Cradle of Filth, Jon left Daemonum and joined Cradle of Filth, briefly replacing Robin Eaglestone. However, in 1995, Kennedy left Cradle of Filth and returned to Daemonum, changing the band's name to Hecate Enthroned and developing a more melodic black metal style and replacing Ian on vocals. Gary was replaced soon after by Andy O'Hara (drums), joining from death metal band Nightmare Visions. Marc and Nigel Dennen remained both as guitarists, with Mark Watson-Jones continuing bass duties.

With this line-up and in the same year, they recorded their first demo tape, An Ode for a Haunted Wood.

Hecate Enthroned toured the UK with Japan's Sigh and Ireland's Primordial in 1995, with long-time bassist Dylan Hughes replacing Mark Watson-Jones on live duties; Hecate Enthroned opened at London Astoria with Ved Buens Ende, Impaled Nazarene and Opeth, gaining firm interest of Blackend Records.

Upon Promeathean Shores, The Slaughter of Innocence and Dark Requiems...: 1995–1998
The An Ode for a Haunted Wood tape got the attention of British record label Blackend Records, that included Hecate on its roster and re-mastered the tape under the title Upon Promeathean Shores (Unscriptured Waters), turning it into an EP, also in 1995. Stylistically, this found the band in a more "true" black metal sound, with squashed production, growled vocals, raging tempos, blast beats and symphonic arrangements. Prior to its formal release, Steve (keyboards), Mark Watson-Jones/Dylan (bass) and Andy O'Hara left the band due to differences with Jon, and were replaced by Craig (drums), Paul Massey (bass) and Michael (keyboards), performing throughout 1996, including the infamous pigs head gig at The Devils Church in London.

In 1997 Craig was replaced by long-time drummer Robert "Rob" Kendrick. In the same year, Hecate released its first full-length album: The Slaughter of Innocence, a Requiem for the Mighty, produced by Andy Sneap, which saw the band enter a faster, more brutal direction, with more emphasis on the symphonic interludes. Although it was very well-received, the band was criticised as a "Cradle of Filth rip-off" by Cradle of Filth frontman Dani Filth.

In the end of 1997, Paul Massey and Marc left the band, Paul was replaced by Dylan Hughes (who returned to the band after leaving it in 1995) and Marc was replaced by long-time guitarist Andy Milnes; Next year, they released their second full-length, Dark Requiems... and Unsilent Massacre, this time lowering the speed and using the keyboards as the primary instrument and creating more horror-styled atmospheres, though still retaining the brutal heaviness of the first two albums.

Change in direction, Kings of Chaos and Miasma: 1998–2001
A couple of months after the release of Dark Requiems..., due to problems and creative divergences between him and the rest of the band, vocalist Jon Kennedy was fired. Keyboardist Michael also left the band; he was then replaced by Darren "Daz" Bishop, and Kennedy was replaced by Dean "The Serpent" Seddon. In the following year they recorded their first album with Seddon, Kings of Chaos; its style changed drastically from that of the previous three releases, heading towards a more death metal-oriented direction, while still retaining the keyboards and dark black metal melodies of the older albums.

In 2001, Hecate released a small EP of original songs plus a cover of "Buried Alive" by Venom, entitled Miasma. In the same year, Dean Seddon guest-starred on Akercocke's album The Goat of Mendes, providing additional vocals for the track "The Serpent".

Redimus, line-up changes and Virulent Rapture: 2004–2013
In 2004, Dean temporarily left the band, and was briefly replaced by Dagon. Keyboardist Daz also left and was replaced by Pete White. However, Dean would return for the recording of their fourth studio album, Redimus. This continues along the sound originally heard on Kings of Chaos, with death metal-style guitars, tempos and growls mixed with symphonic black metal keyboards, melodies and grim screaming. There are also elements of progressive tendencies, as evidenced in the title track and "Morbeea", an acoustic track heavily influenced by Spanish flamenco music. Jason Mendonça of Akercocke guest-stars in this album. Redimus was also the last album by Hecate Enthroned to be released by Blackend; they signed onto a new label, Crank Music Group, in September 2013.

2006 saw Hecate Enthroned embark on a UK headline tour playing in London, Southampton, Nottingham, Bradford and Wolverhampton. 2007 saw them perform in Norway at Inferno Festival alongside Immortal, as well as several shows in Spain, Bulgaria, Romania and Germany. The band was scheduled to do a gig in Bogotá in December 2012, in what would be their first show in South America, but it was cancelled due to inner problems between the band. The show in Bogotá was then rescheduled for 11 July 2015, only to be cancelled again.

On 10 December 2012, the band announced via their official Facebook page that they fired both vocalist Dean Seddon and drummer Rob Kendrick. Rob was then replaced by Gareth Hardy, and on 14 April 2013 Elliot Beaver was announced as Seddon's replacement.

In a 21 January 2013 interview with webzine RoarRock, the band announced that a new studio album, tentatively titled Virulent Rapture, was in the works. It was released by Crank Music Group on 25 November 2013. Sarah Jezebel Deva of Angtoria and Cradle of Filth fame guest-stars on Virulent Rapture providing soprano vocals for a track. A tour around Europe in order to promote the album came afterwards.

In February 2013, guitarist Nigel Dennen and bassist Dylan Hughes were interviewed for the Hungarian documentary Attention! Black Metal!.

Elliot Beaver's departure and Embrace of the Godless Aeon: 2014–present
They announced on their official Facebook on 7 July 2015 that Elliot had parted ways with the band. He was eventually replaced by Joe Stamps in late July.

Since 2014, the band had been preparing for a new album, which was finally released 25 January 2019 by M-Theory Audio and titled Embrace of the Godless Aeon. Thus marks Stamps' first work with the group.

In 2020 the band announced via Facebook that Gareth Hardy would be leaving the band. On 5 July the band announced that Matt Holmes would be the new drummer.

Band members

Current
Nigel Dennen – guitar (1993–present)
Dylan Hughes – bass guitar (1995, 1997–present)
Andy Milnes – guitar (1997–present)
Pete White – keyboards (2004–present)
Matt Holmes – drums (2020–present)
Joe Stamps – vocals (2015–present)

Former
Jon Kennedy – vocals (1993–1994, 1995–1998), bass (1993–1994)
Dean "The Serpent" Seddon – vocals (1998–2004, 2004–2012)
Elliot Beaver – vocals (2013–2015)
Marc Evans – guitar (1993–1997, died 2020)
Paul Massey – bass (1995–1997)
Michael Snell – keyboards (1995–1999)
Craig – drums (1995–1996)
Darren "Daz" Bishop – keyboards (1999–2004)
Dagon – vocals (2004)
Robert "Rob" Kendrick – drums (1997–2012)
Ian Maiden – vocals (1994–1995)
Mark Watson-Jones – bass (1994–1995)
Gary – drums (1993–1994)
Andy O'Hara – drums (1994–1995)
Gareth Hardy – drums (2012–2020)

Timeline

Discography

Demo tapes 
 Dreams to Mourn (1993 – as Daemonum)
 An Ode for a Haunted Wood (1995)

Extended plays 
 Upon Promeathean Shores (Unscriptured Waters) (1995)
 Miasma (2001)

Studio albums 
 The Slaughter of Innocence, a Requiem for the Mighty (1997)
 Dark Requiems... and Unsilent Massacre (1998)
 Kings of Chaos (1999)
 Redimus (2004)
 Virulent Rapture (2013)
 Embrace of the Godless Aeon (2019)

References

External links 
 
 Hecate Enthroned biography at Encyclopaedia Metallum

British black metal musical groups
Musical groups established in 1993
Symphonic black metal musical groups